Nigeria made its Paralympic Games début at the 1992 Summer Paralympics in Barcelona. It sent a delegation of six male athletes to compete in track & field, powerlifting and table tennis.

History 
Nigeria made its Paralympic Games début at the 1992 Summer Paralympics in Barcelona when they sent a delegation of six men  to compete in track & field, powerlifting and table tennis.  Adeoye Ajibola won two gold medals in sprint, while Monday Emoghawve obtained one in powerlifting. Nigeria has participated in every subsequent edition of the Summer Paralympics, though it has never taken part in the Winter Paralympics.

At the Tokyo 2020 Summer Games, Nigeria won 10 medals (4 gold, 1 silver, and 5 bronze), bringing its total number of medals to 80.

Medals

Medals by Summer Games

Medals by Winter Games

Medals by Summer Sport

Medals by Winter Sport

Medallists
Nigeria made its Paralympic debut at the 1992 Summer Paralympics, where they claimed three gold medals.

See also
 Nigeria at the Olympics

References